Baani Sandhu is a Punjabi singer, and actress known for her work in Punjabi- language music and films.

Early life 
Baani Sandhu was born as Rupinder Kaur Sandhu on 18 December 1993 in Amritsar,Punjab, India.  She  belongs to Jat Sikh family.Baani experienced childhood in Mohali. She did her tutoring from Govt Model Sr Sec School, Area 37-D, Chandigarh. Subsequent to finishing her tutoring, she did her graduation in designing.

Music career 
Baani Sandhu began her singing profession in 2018 with the Punjabi tune Fauji Di Bandook. The melody was delivered under Humble Music and Gippy Grewal. Then, she worked together with the Punjabi Singer Dilpreet Dhillon. She got her break through in 2019 with song 8 Parche  which appeared on Global YouTube weekly chart and Uk Music Asian Charts.

Discography

Studio albums

Singles discography

As lead singer

As featured aritst

Soundtrack

Filmography

External links

References 

Living people
1993 births
21st-century Indian actresses
21st-century Indian musicians
Actresses from Punjab, India